The first USS Monaghan (DD-32) was a modified  in the United States Navy during World War I and later in the United States Coast Guard, designated (CG-15). She was named for Ensign John R. Monaghan.

Monaghan was laid down on 1 June 1910 by Newport News Shipbuilding Company, Newport News, Virginia; launched on 18 February 1911; sponsored by Mrs. F. J. Gavin, sister of Ensign Monaghan; and commissioned on 21 June 1911, Lieutenant Commander W. P. Cronan in command.

World War I
Joining the Atlantic Fleet, Monaghan took part in fleet readiness training and operations which prepared the US Navy to enter action immediately when its country joined the Allies in World War I. Monaghans first war service was on patrol along the Atlantic coast; she then escorted troop convoys through the dangerous mid-ocean section of their crossings. From November 1917 until the Armistice a year later, Monaghan made antisubmarine patrols against the U-boat menace in European waters. Returning from occupation duty, Monaghan decommissioned at Philadelphia on 4 November 1919.

Inter-war period
Monaghan was transferred to the Coast Guard on 7 June 1924 to serve in the Rum Patrol. She was stationed at New London, Connecticut until she was sent to Boston, Massachusetts in 1930.

She was returned to the Navy on 8 May 1931. Her name was dropped on 1 July 1933 so that it might be assigned to a new destroyer, and she was sold to Michael Flynn of Brooklyn, New York on 22 August 1934 for scrapping in accordance with the London Naval Treaty.

References

External links
 

 

Paulding-class destroyers
Monaghan-class destroyers
World War I destroyers of the United States
Ships built in Newport News, Virginia
1911 ships